The Salentino Cuts  is the 22nd studio album (and first covers album) by British rock band UFO. The album was released on Cleopatra Records on 29 September 2017. It was the final studio release by the band prior to the 2019 death of guitarist/keyboardist Paul Raymond.  In reference to the album title, Bassist Rob De Luca stated “We recorded the album in Hannover, Germany. We would often end up at an Italian restaurant afterward to eat, drink, hang and plan out the next day. The restaurant is called Salentino's. So it became our defacto clubhouse.”

UFO covers songs from The Yardbirds, The Doors, Mad Season, Steppenwolf, John Mellencamp, Montrose, Mountain, Bill Withers, Tom Petty, Robin Trower, ZZ Top and The Animals.

Track listing

Personnel

Band members
 Phil Mogg – vocals
 Vinnie Moore – all guitars
 Paul Raymond – keyboards, backing vocals
 Rob De Luca – bass
 Andy Parker – drums

Reviews 
Music review: UFO - "The Salentino Cuts", Herald - Standard 
UFO - Salentino Cuts (Album Review) - Cryptic Rock

References

External links
 UFO (5) – The Salentino Cuts Discogs

2017 albums
UFO (band) albums
Covers albums